Convex or convexity may refer to:

Science and technology
 Convex lens, in optics

Mathematics
 Convex set, containing the whole line segment that joins points
 Convex polygon, a polygon which encloses a convex set of points
 Convex polytope, a polytope with a convex set of points
 Convex metric space, a generalization of the convexity notion in abstract metric spaces
 Convex function, when the line segment between any two points on the graph of the function lies above or on the graph
 Convex conjugate, of a function
 Convexity (algebraic geometry), a restrictive technical condition for algebraic varieties originally introduced to analyze Kontsevich moduli spaces

Economics and finance
 Convexity (finance), second derivatives in financial modeling generally
 Convexity in economics
 Bond convexity, a measure of the sensitivity of the duration of a bond to changes in interest rates
 Convex preferences, an individual's ordering of various outcomes

Other uses
 Convex Computer, a former company that produced supercomputers

See also
 List of convexity topics
 Non-convexity (economics), violations of the convexity assumptions of elementary economics
 Obtuse angle